The Duke Energy Plaza is a , 40 floor skyscraper in Uptown Charlotte, North Carolina. Upon its completion it will become the third largest building in Charlotte by leasable square feet  and serve as the corporate headquarters of Duke Energy.  It will house up to 4,400 Duke Energy employees and contractors.  The entire building features  of space, including  of retail space, a 7 floor parking garage for 1,100 vehicles, and will be a LEED-Gold Certified Class AA  office tower.

History 

The site is located directly across from the former Duke Energy Center which once housed Duke Energy's corporate headquarters.  The lobby will also be on South Tryon Street. The site is a 2.1 acre former parking lot that was purchased in 2017 for $27.5 million.  The land purchase was six transactions from two separate companies.  1.8 acres was divided into 5 transactions purchased from Consolidated Realty Co. for $22.9 million.  The final .3 acre lot was purchased from Eastern Federal Corp. for $4.6 million.

The building combines tube structure design with traditional cast-place concrete.  The tower is the second-tallest building in the world to use this design.  It also utilized a form work system that climbed with the structure to create concretes forms.  According to building contractor Batson-Cook "The schedule the team has established allows them to turn a 25,000-square-foot floor every week on the tower," according to a Baston-Cook news release. "Once a floor had been poured, the hydraulic lifting system rose the frame up to the next level and prepared for the next form. A system like this improved efficiency, reduced time spent lifting the frame from level to level, and improved the team’s safety performance."

Affiliates of CGA Capital and Childress Klein funded the construction and development cost, and once completed will buy the building for an estimated $675 million, a record high building sale for Charlotte.  The sale price could vary since final construction costs have not yet been determined.  Childress Klein is the developer of the project.  Duke will lease back the entire building.

On August 20, 2021, the building was topped off when the last patch of concrete floor was added.  It is scheduled to be completed by the end of 2022 with interior work completed in 2023.

Duke has 7,700 employees in the Charlotte area working in numerous offices. The company is reducing its real estate footprint by moving out of a number of buildings such as 401 S. College Street, 526 S. Church Street, 4320 Yancey Road and 400 South Tryon. Many of the employees from the buildings that are closing will be relocating to the tower. Also, the COVID-19 pandemic has changed the company's views about having employees work from the office full time. It is expected many employees will work from home part time. Even after completion of the tower, Duke will continue to occupy Optimist Hall, NASCAR Plaza, and Piedmont Town Center (until 2025). Duke estimates they will save $85 to $90 million over the next five years.

Prior to the Duke Energy Plaza, Duke's most visible presence was the Duke Energy Center. As of May 2021 Duke occupied  spanning 21 floors. On May 17, 2021, Duke announced it planned vacate the building entirely. Wells Fargo, the building owner, plans to fill the space with some of its own employees as they are planning to stop leasing the One Wells Fargo Center.

As of December 31, 2021 Duke had exited its lease of the Duke Energy Center with all Duke employees having vacated the building prior to the holidays. All Duke Energy signs and plaques have been removed from the building and it has been temporarily renamed 550 South Tryon. When the Duke Energy Plaza is completed, Duke Energy will relocate their employees into the building as its new headquarters.

On September 21, 2022, Duke Energy finished installing its name and logo on the north and south sides of the new building.  The exterior of the building was mostly finished at that time with small landscaping projects remaining and the company was conducting testing of exterior lighting schemes.  However, at the same time only about 40% of the interior work was finished and none of the 40 floors were complete.  Building occupancy is expected to begin in January 2023.  However, full occupancy is not expected until the third quarter of 2023.

See also
 List of tallest buildings in North Carolina / the United States / the world
 List of tallest buildings in Charlotte, North Carolina
 Uptown Charlotte

References

External links

Skyscrapers in Charlotte, North Carolina